Mekong River moss is served fried by street vendors in Laos. The dish is served at many locations in Luang Prabang.

See also
Laotian cuisine

References

Lao cuisine